Peter Marsh may refer to:
Peter Marsh (social scientist) (born 1950), British academic in the fields of sociology and social work
Pete Marsh, Iron Age bog body
Peter Marsh (athlete) (1948–2012), Australian Paralympian
Peter Marsh (ice hockey) (born 1956), hockey player 
Peter Marsh (musician) (born 1952), UK singer, songwriter, guitarist and music producer